The Copernican Revolution is a 1957 book by the philosopher Thomas Kuhn, in which the author provides an analysis of the Copernican Revolution, documenting the pre-Ptolemaic understanding through the Ptolemaic system and its variants until the eventual acceptance of the Keplerian system.

Kuhn argues that the Ptolemaic system provided broader appeal than a simple astronomical system but also became intertwined in broader philosophical and theological beliefs. Kuhn argues that this broader appeal made it more difficult for other systems to be proposed.

Summary

At the end of the book, Kuhn summarizes the achievements of Copernicus and Newton, while comparing the incompatibility of Newtonian physics with Aristotelian concepts that preceded the then new physics. Kuhn also noted that discoveries, such as that produced by Newton, were not in agreement with the prevailing worldview during his lifetime.

References

Further reading

 Kuhn, T. S. (1970, 2012). The Structure of Scientific Revolutions. (4th ed.) University of Chicago Press. ISBNs: 0226458113, 0226458121, 9780226458113, and 9780226458120.
 

1957 non-fiction books
Books by Thomas Kuhn
English-language books
Harvard University Press books
History of astrology
Works about the history of astronomy
Books about the history of physics
American non-fiction books
Copernican Revolution
Philosophy of science literature